Algund is a comune (municipality) in South Tyrol in northern Italy, located about  northwest of Bolzano.

Geography

Algund borders the following municipalities: Lana, Marling, Merano, Naturns, Partschins, Plaus and Tirol.

Frazioni
The municipality of Algund contains the frazioni (subdivisions, mainly villages and hamlets) Aschbach (Riolagundo), Forst (Foresta), Mitterplars (Plars di Mezzo), Mühlbach (Riomolino), Oberplars (Plars di Sopra) and Vellau (Velloi).

History

Place name
The name apud Algunde (Latin for close to Algund) appears for the first time in 994.

Coat-of-arms
The emblem is a barrel of wine, overhanged by a vine-shoot of black grapes, on or bordered by an argent and gules crown gear. The barrel and grapes symbolize the viticulture practiced in the area, the argent and gules indented frame represents the membership to the Tyrol. The emblem was adopted in 1970.

Society

Linguistic distribution
According to the 2011 census, 85.17% of the population speak German, 14.58% Italian and 0.25% Ladin as first language.

Demographic evolution

 note: after 1921 the frazione Forst was switched from Marling to Algund.

References

External links

 Homepage of the municipality

Municipalities of South Tyrol
Articles which contain graphical timelines